Rail transportation in the United States consists primarily of freight shipments, with a well integrated network of standard gauge private freight railroads extending into Canada and Mexico. Passenger service is mainly mass transit and commuter rail in major cities. Intercity passenger service, once a large and vital part of the nation's passenger transportation network, plays a limited role as compared to transportation patterns in many other countries.

The nation's earliest railroads were built in the 1820s and 1830s, primarily in New England and the Mid-Atlantic region. The Baltimore and Ohio Railroad, chartered in 1827, was the nation's first common carrier railroad. By 1850, an extensive railroad network had begun to take shape in the rapidly industrializing Northeastern United States and the Midwest, while relatively fewer railroads were constructed in the primarily agricultural Southern United States. During and after the American Civil War, the first transcontinental railroad was built to connect California with the rest of the national network in Iowa.

Railroads continued to expand throughout the rest of the 1800s, eventually reaching nearly every corner of the nation. The nation's railroads were temporarily nationalized between 1917 and 1920 by the United States Railroad Administration, as a result of U.S. entry into World War I. Railroad mileage in the nation peaked at this time. Railroads were affected deeply by the Great Depression in the United States, with some lines being abandoned during this time. A major increase in traffic during World War II brought a temporary reprieve, but after the war railroads faced intense competition from automobiles and aircraft and began a long decline. Passenger service was especially hard hit, with the federal government creating Amtrak in 1971 to take over responsibility for intercity passenger travel. Numerous railroad companies went bankrupt starting in the 1960s, most notably Penn Central Transportation Company in 1971, in the largest bankruptcy in the nation's history at the time. Once again, the federal government intervened, forming Conrail in 1976 to assume control of bankrupt railroads in the Northeast.

Railroads' fortunes began to change following the passage of the Staggers Rail Act in 1980, which deregulated railroad companies, who had previously faced much stronger regulation than competing modes of transportation. With innovations such as trailer-on-flatcar and intermodal freight transport, railroad traffic began to increase. Following the Staggers Act, many railroads merged, forming major systems such as CSX and Norfolk Southern in the Eastern United States, and BNSF Railway in the Western United States, while Union Pacific Railroad purchased a number of competitors as well. Another result of the Staggers Act was the rise of shortline railroads, which formed to operate lines that major railroads abandoned or sold off. Hundreds of these companies were formed by the end of the century. Freight railroads invested in modernization and capacity improvements as they entered the 21st century, and intermodal transport continued to grow, while traditional traffic such as coal fell.

History

To 1850 

Between 1762 and 1764 a gravity railroad (mechanized tramway) (Montresor's Tramway) was built by British Army engineers up the steep riverside terrain near the Niagara River waterfall's escarpment at the Niagara Portage (which the local Senecas called "Crawl on All Fours.") in Lewiston, New York.

In the 1820s–1840s, Americans closely watched the development of railways in Great Britain. The main competition came from canals, many of which were in operation under state ownership, and from privately owned steamboats plying the nation's vast river system. In 1829, Massachusetts prepared an elaborate plan. Government support, most especially the detailing of officers from the U.S. Army Corps of Engineers – the nation's only repository of civil engineering expertise – was crucial in assisting private enterprise in building nearly all the country's railroads. Army Engineer officers surveyed and selected routes, planned, designed, and constructed rights-of-way, track, and structures, and introduced the Army's system of reports and accountability to the railroad companies. More than one in ten of the 1,058 graduates from the U.S. Military Academy at West Point between 1802 and 1866 became corporate presidents, chief engineers, treasurers, superintendents and general managers of railroad companies. Among the Army officers who thus assisted the building and managing of the first American railroads were Stephen Harriman Long, George Washington Whistler, and Herman Haupt.

State governments granted charters that created the business corporation and gave a limited right of eminent domain, allowing the railroad to buy needed land, even if the owner objected.
 

The Baltimore and Ohio Railroad (B&O) was chartered in 1827 to build a steam railroad west from Baltimore, Maryland, to a point on the Ohio River. It began scheduled freight service over its first section on May 24, 1830. The first railroad to carry passengers, and, by accident, the first tourist railroad, began operating 1827. It was the Lehigh Coal & Navigation Company, initially a gravity road feeding anthracite coal downhill to the Lehigh Canal and using mule-power to return nine miles up the mountain; but, by the summer of 1829, as documented by newspapers, it regularly carried passengers. Later renamed the Summit Hill & Mauch Chunk Railroad, it added a steam powered cable-return track for true two-way operation by 1843, and ran as a common carrier and tourist road from the 1890s to 1937. Lasting 111 years, the SH&MC is described by some to be the world's first roller coaster.

The first purpose-built common carrier railroad in the northeast was the Mohawk & Hudson Railroad; incorporated in 1826, it began operating in August 1831. Soon, a second passenger line, the Saratoga & Schenectady Railroad, started service in June 1832.
 
In 1835 the B&O completed a branch from Baltimore southward to Washington, D.C. The Boston & Providence Railroad was incorporated in 1831 to build a railroad between Boston, Massachusetts and Providence, Rhode Island; the road was completed in 1835 with the completion of the Canton Viaduct in Canton, Massachusetts.

Numerous short lines were built, especially in the south, to provide connections to the river systems and the river boats common to the era. In Louisiana, the Pontchartrain Rail-Road, a  route connecting the Mississippi River with Lake Pontchartrain at New Orleans was completed in 1831 and provided over a century of operation. Completed in 1830, the Tuscumbia, Courtland & Decatur Railroad became the first railroad constructed west of the Appalachian Mountains; it connected the two Alabama cities of Decatur and Tuscumbia.

Soon, other roads that would themselves be purchased or merged into larger entities, formed. The Camden & Amboy Railroad (C&A), the first railroad built in New Jersey, completed its route between its namesake cities in 1834. The C&A ran successfully for decades connecting New York City to the Delaware Valley, and would eventually become part of the Pennsylvania Railroad.

1851–1900
The B&O's westward route reached the Ohio River in 1852, the first eastern seaboard railroad to do so. Railroad companies in the North and Midwest constructed networks that linked nearly every major city by 1860.

Transcontinental railroad

The First Transcontinental Railroad in the U.S. was built across North America in the 1860s, linking the railroad network of the eastern U.S. with California on the Pacific coast. Finished on May 10, 1869, at the Golden spike event at Promontory Summit, Utah, it created a nationwide mechanized transportation network that revolutionized the population and economy of the American West, catalyzing the transition from the wagon trains of previous decades to a modern transportation system. It achieved the status of first transcontinental railroad by connecting myriad eastern U.S. railroads to the Pacific Ocean.

Authorized by the Pacific Railway Act of 1862 and heavily backed by the federal government, the first transcontinental railroad was the culmination of a decades-long movement to build such a line and was one of the crowning achievements of the presidency of Abraham Lincoln, completed four years after his death. The building of the railroad required enormous feats of engineering and labor in the crossing of the Great Plains and the Rocky Mountains by the Union Pacific Railroad (UP) and Central Pacific Railroad, the two federally chartered enterprises that built the line westward and eastward respectively. The building of the railroad was motivated in part to bind the Union together during the strife of the American Civil War. It substantially accelerated the populating of the West by homesteaders, leading to rapid cultivation of new farm lands. The Central Pacific and the Southern Pacific Railroad combined operations in 1870 and formally merged in 1885; the Union Pacific originally bought the Southern Pacific in 1901 and was forced to divest it in 1913, but took it over again in 1996.

Much of the original roadbed is still in use today and owned by UP, which is descended from both of the original railroads.

Rail gauge selection

This and the standardization of couplings and air brakes enabled the pooling and interchange of locomotives and rolling stock.

Impact of railroads on the economy

The railroad had its largest impact on the American transportation system during the second half of the 19th century. The standard historical interpretation holds that the railroads were central to the development of a national market in the United States and served as a model of how to organize, finance and manage a large corporation, along with allowing growth of the American population outside of the eastern regions.

Take-off Thesis
In 1944, American economic historian Leland Jenks (having conducted an analysis based on Joseph Schumpeter's theory of innovation) similarly claims that railroads had a direct impact on the growth of the United States' real income and an indirect impact on its economic expansion. In his Rostovian Take-off Thesis, Walt W. Rostow systematically developed the Jenks model that railroads were crucial to American economic growth. According to Rostow, railroads were responsible for the "take-off" of American industrialization in the period of 1843–1860. This "take-off" in economic growth occurred because the railroad helped to decrease transportation costs, transport new products and goods to commercial markets, and generally widen the market. Furthermore, the development of railroads stimulated the growth of the modern coal, iron, and engineering industries, all of which were essential for wider economic growth. According to Rostow's Take-off Thesis, railroads generated new investment, which simultaneously helped develop financial markets in the United States.

Contemporary American economic historians have challenged this conventional view. The respective findings of Robert Fogel and Albert Fishlow do not support Rostow's claim that railroads stimulated widespread industrialization by increasing demand for coal, iron, and machinery. Drawing upon historical data, Robert Fogel found that the impact of railroads on the iron and steel industries was minimal: from 1840 to 1860, railroad production used less than five percent of the total pig iron produced. In addition, Fogel argues, only six percent of total coal production from 1840 to 1860 was consumed by railroads through consumption of iron products. Like Fogel, Fishlow showed that most railroads used very little coal during this time period because they were able to burn wood instead. Fishlow also found that iron used by railroads was only 20% of net consumption in the 1850s.

Fogel and "essential" issue
Fogel concludes that railroads were important but not "essential" to late 19th-century growth in the U.S. in the sense that a possible alternative existed even if it was never tried.  Fogel focuses on the "social saving" created by railroads, which he defines as the difference between the actual level of national income in 1890 and the theoretical level of national income if transportation somehow existed in the most efficient way possible to the absence of the railroad. He found that without the railroad, America's gross national product (GNP) would have been 7.2% less in 1890. While the largest contribution to GNP growth was made by any single innovation before 1900, this percentage only represents 2–3 years of GNP growth.

Fogel makes several key assumptions and decisions in his analysis. First, his calculations comprise transportation between the primary markets of the Midwest and the secondary markets of the East and South (interregional) and transportation between cities and rural areas (intraregional). Second, he chooses to focus on the shipment of four agricultural commodities: wheat, corn, beef, and pork. Third, Fogel's social saving calculation accounts for costs not included in water rates (which include the cargo losses in transit, transshipment costs, extra wagon haulage, time lost because of slower speed, and because canals froze in the winter, and capital costs). One criticism of Fogel's analysis is that it does not account for the externalities or "spill-over" effects of the railroads, which (if included) may have increased his estimate for social savings [definition needed]. Railroads provided much of the demand for technological advances in a number of areas, including heat dynamics, combustion engineering, thermodynamics, metallurgy, civil engineering, machining, and metal fabrication. Furthermore, Fogel does not discuss the role railroads played in the development of the financial system or in attracting foreign capital, which otherwise might not have been available.

Albert Fishlow
Fishlow estimates that the railroad's social savings—or what he terms "direct benefits"—were higher than those calculated by Fogel. Fishlow's research may indicate that the development of railroads significantly influenced real income in the United States. Instead of Fogel's term "social saving", Fishlow uses the term "direct benefits" to describe the difference between the actual level of national income in 1859 and the theoretical level of income using the least expensive, but existing alternative means. Fishlow calculated the social savings in 1859 at 4 percent of GNP and in 1890 at 15 percent of GNP—higher than Fogel's estimate of 7.2% in 1890.

Monopolies, antitrust law, and regulation
Industrialists such as Cornelius Vanderbilt and Jay Gould became wealthy through railroad ownerships, as large railroad companies such as the New York Central, Grand Trunk Railway and the Southern Pacific spanned several states. In response to monopolistic practices (such as price fixing) and other excesses of some railroads and their owners, Congress created the Interstate Commerce Commission (ICC) in 1887. The ICC indirectly controlled the business activities of the railroads through issuance of extensive regulations. Congress also enacted antitrust legislation to prevent railroad monopolies, beginning with the Sherman Antitrust Act in 1890.

1901–1970

The principal mainline railroads concentrated their efforts on moving freight and passengers over long distances. But many had suburban services near large cities, which might also be served by Streetcar and Interurban lines. The Interurban was a concept which relied almost exclusively on passenger traffic for revenue. Unable to survive the Great Depression, the failure of most Interurbans by that time left many cities without suburban passenger railroads, although the largest cities such as New York City, Chicago, Boston and Philadelphia continued to have suburban service. The major railroads passenger flagship services included multi-day journeys on luxury trains resembling hotels, which were unable to compete with airlines in the 1950s. Rural communities were served by slow trains no more than twice a day. They survived until the 1960s because the same train hauled the Railway Post Office cars, paid for by the US Post Office. RPOs were withdrawn when mail sorting was mechanized.

As early as the 1930s, automobile travel had begun to cut into the rail passenger market, somewhat reducing economies of scale, but it was the development of the Interstate Highway System and of commercial aviation in the 1950s and 1960s, as well as increasingly restrictive regulation, that dealt the most damaging blows to rail transportation, both passenger and freight. General Motors and others were convicted of running the streetcar industry into the ground purposefully in what is referred to as the Great American Streetcar Scandal. There was little point in operating passenger trains to advertise freight service when those who made decisions about freight shipping traveled by car and by air, and when the railroads' chief competitors for that market were interstate trucking companies.

Soon, the only things keeping most passenger trains running were legal obligations. Meanwhile, companies who were interested in using railroads for profitable freight traffic were looking for ways to get out of those legal obligations, and it looked like intercity passenger rail service would soon become extinct in the United States beyond a few highly populated corridors. The final blow for passenger trains in the U.S. came with the loss of railroad post offices in the 1960s. On May 1, 1971, the federally funded Amtrak took over (with a few exceptions) all intercity passenger rail service in the continental United States. The Rio Grande, with its Denver-Ogden Rio Grande Zephyr and the Southern with its Washington, D.C.–New Orleans Southern Crescent chose to stay out of Amtrak, and the Rock Island, with two intrastate Illinois trains, was too far gone to be included into Amtrak.

Freight transportation continued to labor under regulations developed when rail transport had a monopoly on intercity traffic, and railroads only competed with one another. An entire generation of rail managers had been trained to operate under this regulatory regime. Labor unions and their work rules were likewise a formidable barrier to change. Overregulation, management and unions formed an "iron triangle" of stagnation, frustrating the efforts of leaders such as the New York Central's Alfred E. Perlman. In particular, the dense rail network in the Northeastern U.S. was in need of radical pruning and consolidation. A spectacularly unsuccessful beginning was the 1968 formation and subsequent bankruptcy of the Penn Central, barely two years later.

1970–present

Historically, on routes where a single railroad has had an undisputed monopoly, passenger service was as spartan and as expensive as the market and ICC regulation would bear, since such railroads had no need to advertise their freight services. However, on routes where two or three railroads were in direct competition with each other for freight business, such railroads would spare no expense to make their passenger trains as fast, luxurious, and affordable as possible, as it was considered to be the most effective way of advertising their profitable freight services.

The National Association of Railroad Passengers (NARP) was formed in 1967 to lobby for the continuation of passenger trains. Its lobbying efforts were hampered somewhat by Democratic opposition to any sort of rail subsidies to the privately owned railroads, and Republican opposition to nationalization of the railroad industry. The proponents were aided by the fact that few in the federal government wanted to be held responsible for the seemingly inevitable extinction of the passenger train, which most regarded as tantamount to political suicide. The urgent need to solve the passenger train disaster was heightened by the bankruptcy filing of the Penn Central, the dominant railroad in the Northeastern United States, on June 21, 1970.

Under the Rail Passenger Service Act of 1970, Congress created the National Railroad Passenger Corporation (NRPC) to subsidize and oversee the operation of intercity passenger trains. The Act provided that
 Any railroad operating intercity passenger service could contract with the NRPC, thereby joining the national system.
 Participating railroads bought into the new corporation using a formula based on their recent intercity passenger losses. The purchase price could be satisfied either by cash or rolling stock; in exchange, the railroads received Amtrak common stock.
 Any participating railroad was freed of the obligation to operate intercity passenger service after May 1971, except for those services chosen by the U.S. Department of Transportation as part of a "basic system" of service and paid for by NRPC using its federal funds.
 Railroads who chose not to join the Amtrak system were required to continue operating their existing passenger service until 1975 and thenceforth had to pursue the customary ICC approval process for any discontinuance or alteration to the service.

The original working brand name for NRPC was Railpax, which eventually became Amtrak. At the time, many Washington insiders viewed the corporation as a face-saving way to give passenger trains the one "last hurrah" demanded by the public, but expected that the NRPC would quietly disappear in a few years as public interest waned. However, while Amtrak's political and financial support have often been shaky, popular and political support for Amtrak has allowed it to survive into the 21st century.

Similarly, to preserve a declining freight rail industry, Congress passed the Regional Rail Reorganization Act of 1973 (sometimes called the "3R Act").  The act was an attempt to salvage viable freight operations from the bankrupt Penn Central and other lines in the northeast, mid-Atlantic and Midwestern regions. The law created the Consolidated Rail Corporation (Conrail), a government-owned corporation, which began operations in 1976. Another law, the Railroad Revitalization and Regulatory Reform Act of 1976 (the "4R Act"), provided more specifics for the Conrail acquisitions and set the stage for more comprehensive deregulation of the railroad industry. Portions of the Penn Central, Erie Lackawanna, Reading Railroad, Ann Arbor Railroad, Central Railroad of New Jersey, Lehigh Valley, and Lehigh and Hudson River were merged into Conrail. On December 31, 1996 the Atchison, Topeka and Santa Fe Railway merged with the Burlington Northern Railroad, creating the Burlington Northern Santa Fe Railway.

The freight industry continued its decline until Congress passed the Staggers Rail Act in 1980, which largely deregulated the rail industry. Since then, U.S. freight railroads have reorganized, discontinued their lightly used routes and returned to profitability.

Freight railroads

Freight railroads play an important role in the U.S. economy, especially for moving imports and exports using containers, and for shipments of coal and oil. According to the British news magazine The Economist, "They are universally recognised in the industry as the best in the world." Productivity rose 172% between 1981 and 2000, while rates decreased by 55% (after accounting for inflation). Rail's share of the American freight market rose to 43%, the highest for any rich country.

U.S. railroads still play a major role in the nation's freight shipping. They carried 750 billion ton-miles by 1975 which doubled to 1.5 trillion ton-miles in 2005. In the 1950s, the U.S. and Europe moved roughly the same percentage of freight by rail; by 2000, the share of U.S. rail freight was 38% while in Europe only 8% of freight traveled by rail. In 2000, while U.S. trains moved 2,390 billion ton-kilometers of freight, the 15-nation European Union moved only 304 billion ton-kilometers of freight. In terms of ton-miles, railroads annually move more than 25% of the United States' freight and connect businesses with each other across the country and with markets overseas. In 2018, US rail freight had a transport energy efficiency of 473 tons.miles per gallon of fuel.

U.S. freight railroads are separated into three classes, set by the Surface Transportation Board, based on annual revenues:
 Class I for freight railroads with annual operating revenues above $346.8 million in 2006 dollars. In 1900, there were 132 Class I railroads.
 Class II for freight railroads with revenues between $27.8 million and $346.7 million in 2000 dollars
 Class III for all other freight revenues.

In 2013, the U.S. moved more oil out of North Dakota by rail than by the Trans-Alaska pipeline. This trend—tenfold in two years and 40-fold in five years—is forecast to increase.

Classes of freight railroads
There are four different classes of freight railroads: Class I, regional, local line haul, and switching & terminal. Class I railroads are defined as those with revenue of at least $346.8 million in 2006. They comprise just one percent of the number of freight railroads, but account for 67 percent of the industry's mileage, 90 percent of its employees, and 93 percent of its freight revenue.

A regional railroad is a line haul railroad with at least  and/or revenue between $40 million and the Class I threshold. There were 33 regional railroads in 2006. Most have between 75 and 500 employees.

In 2006, there were 323 local line haul railroads. They generally perform point-to-point service over short distances.

Switching and terminal (S&T) carriers are railroads that primarily provide switching and/or terminal services, regardless of revenue. They perform pick up and delivery services within a certain area.

Traffic and public benefits

U.S. freight railroads operate in a highly competitive marketplace. According to a 2010 FRA report, within the U.S., railroads carried 39.5% of freight by ton-mile, followed by trucks (28.6%), oil pipelines (19.6%), barges (12%) and air (0.3%). However, railroads' revenue share has been slowly falling for decades, a reflection of the intensity of the competition they face and of the large rate reductions railroads have passed through to their customers over the years.

In 2011, North American railroads operated 1,471,736 freight cars and 31,875 locomotives, with 215,985 employees. They originated 39.53 million carloads (averaging 63 tons each) and generated $81.7 billion in freight revenue of present 2014. The average haul was 917 miles. The largest (Class 1) U.S. railroads carried 10.17 million intermodal containers and 1.72 million piggyback trailers. Intermodal traffic was 6.2% of tonnage originated and 12.6% of revenue. The largest commodities were coal, chemicals, farm products, nonmetallic minerals and intermodal. Other major commodities carried include lumber, automobiles, and waste materials. Coal alone was 43.3% of tonnage and 24.7% of revenue. Coal accounted for roughly half of U.S. electricity generation and was a major export. As natural gas became cheaper than coal, coal supplies dropped 11% in 2015 but coal rail freight dropped by up to 40%, allowing an increase in car transport by rail, some in tri-level railcars. US coal consumption dwindled from over 1,100 million tons in 2008 to 687 million tons in 2018.

The fastest growing rail traffic segment is currently intermodal. Intermodal is the movement of shipping containers or truck trailers by rail and at least one other mode of transportation, usually trucks or ocean-going vessels. Intermodal combines the door-to-door convenience of trucks with the long-haul economy of railroads. Rail intermodal has tripled in the last 25 years. It plays a critical role in making logistics far more efficient for retailers and others. The efficiency of intermodal provides the U.S. with a huge competitive advantage in the global economy. A major factor in making U.S. rail intermodal freight competitive is the use of double-stack rail transport, where shipping containers are loaded two-high on special freight cars, potential doubling the number of containers one train can carry, with corresponding reductions in operating costs.

Freight rail working with passenger rail
Prior to Amtrak's creation in 1970, intercity passenger rail service in the U.S. was provided by the same companies that provided freight service. When Amtrak was formed, in return for government permission to exit the passenger rail business, freight railroads donated passenger equipment to Amtrak and helped it get started with a capital infusion of some $200 million.

The vast majority of the 22,000 or so miles over which Amtrak operates are actually owned by freight railroads. By law, freight railroads must grant Amtrak access to their track upon request. In return, Amtrak pays fees to freight railroads to cover the incremental costs of Amtrak's use of freight railroad tracks.

Passenger railroads

The sole long-distance intercity passenger railroad in the continental U.S. is Amtrak, and multiple current commuter rail systems provide regional intercity services such as New York-New Haven, Stockton-San Jose and West Palm Beach-Miami. In Alaska, intercity service is provided by Alaska Railroad instead of Amtrak. Commuter rail systems exist in more than a dozen metropolitan areas, but these systems are not extensively interconnected, so commuter rail cannot be used alone to traverse the country. Commuter systems have been proposed in approximately two dozen other cities, but interplays between various local-government administrative bottlenecks and ripple effects from the 2007–2012 global financial crisis have generally pushed such projects farther and farther into the future, or have even sometimes mothballed them entirely.

The most culturally notable and physically evident exception to the general lack of significant passenger rail transport in the U.S. is the Northeast Corridor between Washington, Baltimore, Philadelphia, New York City, and Boston, with significant branches in Connecticut and Massachusetts. The corridor handles frequent passenger service that is both Amtrak and commuter. New York City itself is noteworthy for high usage of passenger rail transport, both subway and commuter rail (Long Island Rail Road, Metro-North Railroad, New Jersey Transit). The subway system is used by one third of all U.S. mass transit users. Chicago also sees high rail ridership, with a local elevated system, one of the world's last interurban lines, and fourth most-ridden commuter rail system in the United States: Metra. Other major cities with substantial rail infrastructure include Philadelphia's SEPTA, Boston's MBTA, and Washington, D.C.'s network of commuter rail and rapid transit. Denver, Colorado constructed a new electrified commuter rail system in the 2000s to complement the city's light rail system. The commuter rail systems of San Diego and Los Angeles, Coaster and Metrolink, connect in Oceanside, California. The San Francisco Bay Area additionally hosts several local passenger rail operators, the largest of which are Caltrain, the Altamont Corridor Express, Sonoma–Marin Area Rail Transit, and Bay Area Rapid Transit.

Privately run inter-city passenger rail operations have also been restarted since 2018 in south Florida, with additional routes under development. Brightline is a higher-speed rail train, run by All Aboard Florida. It began service in January 2018 between Fort Lauderdale and West Palm Beach; its service was extended to Miami in May 2018, with an extension to Orlando International Airport planned by 2022. Brightline has also proposed a further extension of its service from Orlando to Tampa via Walt Disney World, and a high-speed rail service from Victorville, California to Las Vegas. In addition, the Texas Central Railway is currently developing plans for a proposed greenfield high-speed rail line using Japanese Shinkansen trains between Dallas and Houston. Construction was expected to begin in 2020 for a 2026 opening,
but a major lawsuit delayed the project and as of February 2023 there are no signs of construction activity.

Car types
The basic design of a passenger car was standardized by 1870. By 1900, the main car types were: baggage, coach, combine, diner, dome car, lounge, observation, private, Pullman, railroad post office (RPO) and sleeper.

19th century: First passenger cars and early development

The first passenger cars resembled stagecoaches.

American mail cars first appeared in the 1860s and at first followed English design. They had a hook that would catch the mailbag in its crook.

As locomotive technology progressed in the mid-19th century, trains grew in length and weight. Passenger cars grew along with them, first getting longer with the addition of a second truck (one at each end), and wider as their suspensions improved. Cars built for European use featured side door compartments, while American car design favored a single pair of doors at one end of the car in the car's vestibule; compartmentized cars on American railroads featured a long hallway with doors from the hall to the compartments.

One possible reason for this difference in design principles between American and European carbuilding practice could be the average distance between stations on the two continents. While most European railroads connected towns and villages that were still very closely spaced, American railroads had to travel over much greater distances to reach their destinations. Building passenger cars with a long passageway through the length of the car allowed the passengers easy access to the restroom, among other things, on longer journeys.

Dining cars first appeared in the late 1870s and into the 1880s. Until this time, the common practice was to stop for meals at restaurants along the way (which led to the rise of Fred Harvey's chain of Harvey House restaurants in America). At first, the dining car was simply a place to serve meals that were picked up en route, but they soon evolved to include galleys in which the meals were prepared.

1900–1950: Lighter materials, new car types

The cars of this time were still quite ornate, many of them being built by experienced coach makers and skilled carpenters.

With the 1930s came the widespread use of stainless steel for car bodies. The typical passenger car was now much lighter than its "heavyweight" wood cousins of old. The new "lightweight" and streamlined cars carried passengers in speed and comfort to an extent that had not been experienced to date. Aluminum and Cor-ten were also used in lightweight car construction, but stainless steel was the preferred material for car bodies. It is not the lightest of materials, nor is it the least expensive, but stainless steel cars could be, and often were, left unpainted except for the car's reporting marks that were required by law.

By the end of the 1930s, railroads and car builders were debuting car body and interior styles that could only be dreamed of before. In 1937, the Pullman Company delivered the first cars equipped with roomettes—that is, the car's interior was sectioned off into compartments, much like the coaches that were still in widespread use across Europe. Pullman's roomettes, however, were designed with the single traveler in mind. The roomette featured a large picture window, a privacy door, a single fold-away bed, a sink and small toilet. The roomette's floor space was barely larger than the space taken up by the bed, but it allowed the traveler to ride in luxury compared to the multilevel semiprivate berths of old.

Now that passenger cars were lighter, they were able to carry heavier loads, but the size of the average passenger load that rode in them didn't increase to match the cars' new capacities. The average passenger car couldn't get any wider or longer due to side clearances along the railroad lines, but they generally could get taller because they were still shorter than many freight cars and locomotives. As a result, the railroads soon began building and buying dome and bilevel cars to carry more passengers.

1950–present: High-technology advancements

Carbody styles have generally remained consistent since the middle of the 20th century. While new car types have not made much of an impact, the existing car types have been further enhanced with new technology.

Starting in the 1950s, the passenger travel market declined in North America, though there was growth in commuter rail. The higher clearances in North America enabled bi-level commuter coaches that could hold more passengers. These cars started to become common in the United States in the 1960s.

While intercity passenger rail travel declined in the United States during the 1950s, ridership continued to increase in Europe during that time. With the increase came newer technology on existing and new equipment. The Spanish company Talgo began experimenting in the 1940s with technology that would enable the axles to steer into a curve, allowing the train to move around the curve at a higher speed. The steering axles evolved into mechanisms that would also tilt the passenger car as it entered a curve to counter the centrifugal force experienced by the train, further increasing speeds on existing track. Today, tilting passenger trains are commonplace. Talgo's trains are used on some short and medium distance routes such as Amtrak Cascades from Eugene, Oregon, to Vancouver, British Columbia.

In August 2016, the Department of Transportation approved the largest loan in the department's history, $2.45 billion to upgrade the passenger train service in the Northeast region. The $2.45 billion will be used to purchase 28 new train sets for the high-speed Acela train between Washington through Philadelphia, New York and into Boston. The money will also be used build new stations and platforms. The money will also be used to rehabilitate railroad tracks and upgrade four stations, including Washington's Union Station and Baltimore's Penn Station.

High-speed rail

As of 2022, the only operating high speed rail service in the United States is Amtrak's Acela, between Washington, DC, and Boston. The state of California is constructing its own HSR system, California High-Speed Rail, constructed to  standards in some places. The first section in the Central Valley is due to open around 2027.

Rolling stock reporting marks
Every piece of railroad rolling stock operating in North American interchange service is required to carry a standardized set of reporting marks. The marks are made up of a two- to four-letter code identifying the owner of the equipment accompanied by an identification number and statistics on the equipment's capacity and tare (unloaded) weight. Marks whose codes end in X (such as TTGX) are used on equipment owned by entities that are not common carrier railroads themselves. Marks whose codes end in U are used on containers that are carried in intermodal transport, and marks whose codes end in Z are used on trailers that are carried in intermodal transport, per ISO standard 6346). Most freight cars carry automatic equipment identification RFID transponders.

Typically, railroads operating in the United States reserve one- to four-digit identification numbers for powered equipment such as diesel locomotives and six-digit identification numbers for unpowered equipment. There is no hard and fast rule for how equipment is numbered; each railroad maintains its own numbering policy for its equipment.

List of major United States railroads

 Amtrak
 BNSF Railway
 Canadian National Railway
 Canadian Pacific Railway
 CSX Transportation
 Kansas City Southern Railway
 Norfolk Southern Railway
 Union Pacific Railroad

Rail links with adjacent countries
  Canada – yes – Same gauge  (none via Alaska)
  Mexico – yes – Same gauge

Regulation
Federal regulation of railroads is mainly through the United States Department of Transportation, especially the Federal Railroad Administration which regulates safety, and the Surface Transportation Board which regulates rates, service, the construction, acquisition and abandonment of rail lines, carrier mergers and interchange of traffic among carriers.

Railroads are also regulated by the individual states, for example through the Massachusetts Department of Public Utilities.

See also

 Timeline of United States railway history
 Railroad electrification in the United States
 List of rail transit systems in the United States
 Oldest railroads in North America
 History of rail transport in the United States
 Transportation in the United States
 Federal Employers Liability Act (protects and compensates railroad employees)
 Nationalized Industries in the United States
 Railroad car – general overview of all car types in use

Notes

References

Citations

Sources 

 U.S. Central Intelligence Agency (May 17, 2005), The World Fact Book: United States. Retrieved May 26, 2005.

Further reading

 Fite, Gilbert C., and Jim E. Reese. An Economic History of the United States. Boston, MA: Houghton Mifflin Company (1959).
 Hubbard, Freeman H., Encyclopedia of North American railroading: 150 years of railroading in the United States and Canada. (1981)
 Gallamore, Robert E. and John R. Meyer. American Railroads: Decline and Renaissance in the Twentieth Century, (Harvard University Press, 2014). 
 Harris, Seymour E. American Economic History. New York, NY: McGraw-Hill Book Company, Inc (1961).
 Hughes, Jonathan. American Economic History. Glenview, IL: Scott, Foresman and Company (1983).
 Jenks, Leland H. "Railroads as an Economic Force in American Development," The Journal of Economic History, Vol. 4, No. 1 (May 1944), 1–20. in JSTOR
 Kemmerer, Donald L., and C. Clyde Jones. American Economic History. New York, NY: McGraw-Hill Book Company, Inc. (1969).
 Krooss, Herman E. American Economic Development. Edgewood Cliffs, NJ: Prentice Hall, Inc. (1955).
 Martin, Albro.Railroads Triumphant: The Growth, Rejection, and Rebirth of a Vital American Force (1992)
 Meyer, Balthasar H. History of Transportation in the United States before 1860 (1917)
 Nock, O.S., ed. Encyclopedia of Railways (London, 1977), worldwide coverage, heavily illustrated
 Porter, Glenn, ed. Encyclopedia of American Economic History. Vol. I. New York, NY: Charles Scribner's Sons (1980).
 Riley, C. J. The Encyclopedia of Trains & Locomotives (2002)
 Stover, John F., The Routledge Historical Atlas of the American Railroads (2001)
 
 Taylor, George Rogers, and Irene D. Neu. The American Railroad Network, 1861 – 1890. New York, NY: Arno Press (1981).
 
 Weatherford, Brian A. et al. technical_reports/TR603/ The State of U.S. Railroads A Review of Capacity and Performance Data, PDF from RAND, 2008, 
 Wright, Chester Whitney. Economic History of the United States. Edited by William Homer Spencer. New York, NY: McGraw-Hill Book Company, Inc. (1949).

Video
 Railroads in U.S. History (1830–2010) (2010), set of 4 DVDs, directed by Ron Meyer; #1, "Railroads come to America (1830–1840);" #2, "The First Great Railroad Boom (1841– 1860)"; #3, "A New Era in American Railroading (1861–1870)," #4, "The Second Great Railroad Boom (1871–2010)" link

External links 

 Railroad History Bibliography by Richard Jensen, Montana State University
 John H. White, Jr. Reference Collection, 1880s–1990 – Archives Center, National Museum of American History
 Bibliography of scholarly literature on antebellum railroads – Aaron W. Marrs
 Future rail transport map released by the FRA
 USA by Rail guide book